Belmaya Nepali is a filmmaker from Nepal. She has made several award-winning documentaries depicting the life of women in Nepal especially of those from Dalit community.

Biography
Nepali was born in Lahachowk in Pokhara. She is the youngest of six siblings. She lost her parents at the age of nine. She got married in 2011. Initially she started as a photographer after getting a short training. Her first work was published in 2007 in a book called My World, My Views.

Works
I am Belmaya is a documentary based on her own life which is co-directed by Sue Carpenter 
 Educate Our Daughters is a documentary raising the issues of female education in Nepal.
 Rowing Against the Flow is a documentary about boat women in Pokhara's Phewa lake.
 Stronger is a documentary dealing with the Nepali women.

Awards
 Winner of Toronto Reel Asian International Film Festival (Nov 2018, Canadian Premiere) for Educate Our Daughters
 Winner of UK Asian Film Festival (Mar–Apr 2019, European Premiere) for Educate Our Daughters

References

Nepalese photographers
People from Pokhara
Nepalese women film directors
Nepalese film directors
21st-century Nepalese film directors
Year of birth missing (living people)
Living people